Manheim Township High School is a comprehensive four-year public high school located in Manheim Township, Lancaster County, Pennsylvania, United States. It is the only high school in the Manheim Township School District.

As of the 2018–19 school year, the school had an enrollment of 1,753 students and 118 classroom teachers (on an FTE basis), for a student–teacher ratio of 14.9:1. There were 435 students (24.8% of enrollment) eligible for free lunch and a further 63 eligible for reduced-cost lunch.

History
The school was originally built in the 1950s. A $6 million addition in 1978 added a new library to the building.

In 2006, planning for a construction project commenced which would renovate much of the school's buildings. The $83 million project included a new classroom wing and new gymnasium, and renovated much of the pre-existing 1978 structure. Additionally, most of the initial 1950s building was removed or renovated entirely in this process. Renovations were completed in December 2008.

Academic team
The school has a Quiz Bowl team, which won a national championship in 2000. The team also won a Pennsylvania state championship in 2022.

Arts
The school's student publication is Blue Streak News Online.

Technology 
In 2006, the Pennsylvania Department of Education awarded a grant to the school to buy new technology. The grant was part of Governor Ed Rendell's $20 million Classrooms for the Future Program, which Rendell announced on September 20, 2006. As part of the grant, the school received several SMART Boards, as well as a number of student laptops. On September 20, 2017 all students in grades 9-12 were issued an iPad.

Notable alumni 
 Deb Andraca (1988), Wisconsin state legislator
 Jim Furyk (1988), professional golfer, 2003 U.S. Open champion
 Brad Rutter (1995), Jeopardy! champion
 Lt. Andy Baldwin (1995), The Bachelor
 Danah Michelle Mattas (1996), social networks, internet researcher
 Alec Devon Kreider, Triple murderer
 Zarek Valentin (2009), American soccer player currently playing as a defender for the Houston Dynamo
 Cam Gallagher (2011), American baseball players currently the catcher for the Kansas City Royals

See also 
 Manheim Township
 List of high schools in Pennsylvania
 Education in the United States

References

External links 
 Manheim Township official site
 MTPA main site
 MTSD Moodle

Public high schools in Pennsylvania
Education in Lancaster, Pennsylvania
Schools in Lancaster County, Pennsylvania
1950s establishments in Pennsylvania